Seán Carey (born 15 November 1989) is a Gaelic footballer and hurler from County Tipperary. He plays with the Moyle Rovers Club and the Tipperary intercounty team. In 2010 he helped Tipperary win the Munster Under-21 Football Championship and [Munster Under-21 Hurling Championship. He later won the 2010 All-Ireland Under-21 Hurling Championship. In 2007 he won Munster Minor Hurling Championship & All-Ireland Minor Hurling Championship medals. He won Tipperary Senior Football Championship medal in 2009 with Moyle Rovers. 
Seán made his Championship debut for the Tipperary Senior Football against Limerick in the first round of the Munster Senior Football Championship. Sean captained the 2007 Tipperary Minor Football team and has also played Under 21 Football with Tipperary. He also won an All-Ireland Minor Hurling medal in 2007 playing at wing-forward scoring two goals against Cork in the final

Honours

Club
 Tipperary Senior Football Championship (2): 2007, 2009

County
 Munster Minor Hurling Championship (1): 2007
 All-Ireland Minor Hurling Championship (1): 2007
 Munster Under-21 Football Championship (1): 2010
 Munster Under-21 Hurling Championship (1): 2010
 National Football League Division 3 (1): 2009

References
 

Tipperary inter-county Gaelic footballers
Moyle Rovers Gaelic footballers
Tipperary inter-county hurlers
Moyle Rovers hurlers
Living people
1989 births